The 1981 Stanley Cup playoffs, the playoff tournament of the National Hockey League (NHL) began on April 8, after the conclusion of the 1980–81 NHL season. The playoffs concluded on May 21 with the champion New York Islanders defeating the Minnesota North Stars 5–1 to win the final series four games to one and win the Stanley Cup.

In game one of the Edmonton-Montreal series, Wayne Gretzky recorded five assists, at the time this was a single game playoff record.

These were the last Stanley Cup playoffs conducted under a format that paired teams in each round without regard to division or conference.

Playoff seeds 

The sixteen teams that qualified for the playoffs are ranked 1–16 based on regular season points.

 New York Islanders, Patrick Division champions, Clarence Campbell Conference regular season champions – 110 points
 St. Louis Blues, Smythe Division champions – 107 points
 Montreal Canadiens, Norris Division champions, Prince of Wales Conference regular season champions – 103 points
 Los Angeles Kings – 99 points (43 wins)
 Buffalo Sabres, Adams Division champions – 99 points (39 wins)
 Philadelphia Flyers – 97 points
 Calgary Flames – 92 points
 Boston Bruins – 87 points (37 wins)
 Minnesota North Stars – 87 points (35 wins)
 Chicago Black Hawks – 78 points (31 wins)
 Quebec Nordiques – 78 points (30 wins)
 Vancouver Canucks – 76 points
 New York Rangers – 74 points (30 wins)
 Edmonton Oilers – 74 points (29 wins)
 Pittsburgh Penguins – 73 points
 Toronto Maple Leafs – 71 points

Playoff bracket

Preliminary round

(1) New York Islanders vs. (16) Toronto Maple Leafs 

The New York Islanders, the defending 1980 Stanley Cup champions, entered the playoffs as the regular season, Campbell Conference, and Patrick Division champions, earning 110 points. The Toronto Maple Leafs earned 71 points during the regular season to finish sixteenth overall in the league. This was the second playoff meeting between these two teams, with the only previous meeting being the 1978 Stanley Cup Quarterfinals, where Toronto defeated the Islanders in seven games. The Islanders won three of the four games in this year's regular season series.

Toronto was swept in the opening round of the playoffs for the second consecutive year. New York's series-clinching win in game three was the first (and to date only until the bubble in the 2020 playoffs) time that the Islanders have won a playoff game in Toronto, and this was also only the second (and to date, last) victory that a road team has ever earned in the three series between these two franchises. As of 2019, this series marks the only time that the Islanders have defeated Toronto in the Stanley Cup playoffs. In game one, the Islanders scored three times on the power play, and Bryan Trottier scored twice and added three assists in a decisive 9–2 victory. The Islanders dominance of the Maple Leafs continued in game two, as Trottier recorded a hat trick in a 5-1 Islanders win. The Islanders jumped all over the Maple Leafs quickly in game three, by jumping out to a 5–0 lead after the first period. The Maple Leafs and Islanders traded goals in the second period 19 seconds apart. Game three ended in a series-clinching 6-1 Islanders victory.

(2) St. Louis Blues vs. (15) Pittsburgh Penguins 

The St. Louis Blues entered the playoffs as the Smythe Division champions, earning 107 points. The Pittsburgh Penguins earned 73 points during the regular season to finish fifteenth overall in the league. This was the third playoff meeting between these two teams; the teams split their two previous series. Their most recent meeting was in the 1975 Preliminary round, where Pittsburgh defeated St. Louis in two-game sweep. These teams split this year's four-game regular season series.

In game one of the series, Pittsburgh struck quickly thanks to a Greg Malone goal at 0:15 of the first period. However, the Blues recovered by the end of the second period and took a 3–2 lead into the final period, which they held on to, winning the game 4–2. Game two proved to be a different story, as the Penguins exploded offensively and scored four times in the second period to erase a 1-0 first period deficit. The Blues and Penguins traded goals in the third period, giving Pittsburgh a 6–4 victory that tied the series at a game apiece. Game three went back and forth, with both teams trading goals all game long until Bernie Federko scored his second goal of the game with 4:06 left to play in the third period. The Blues won the game 5-4 and retook home ice advantage in the best-of-five series. The Penguins avoided elimination in game four, as Randy Carlyle and Mike Bullard each scored three points in the game, helping the Penguins to a 6–3 win. Game five was another tight contest and for the first time in the series overtime was required, with the score tied at 3 after regulation time. The game and series ended on Mike Crombeen's second goal of the series, scored at 5:16 of the second overtime period, giving St. Louis a 4–3 win and a 3–2 series victory.

(3) Montreal Canadiens vs. (14) Edmonton Oilers 

The Montreal Canadiens entered the playoffs as the Wales Conference and Norris Division champions, earning 103 points. The Edmonton Oilers earned 74 points during the regular season and finished fourteenth overall, losing the tiebreaker with the New York Rangers in wins (30 to 29). This was the first playoff meeting between these two teams. These teams split this year's four-game regular season series.

The Oilers recorded the first playoff series victory by any of the four teams that joined the NHL in the 1979. It was also the first-ever sweep by the Oilers, including their history as a World Hockey Association franchise. The Oilers gained a 6–3 victory in game one, in large part due to Wayne Gretzky's five-assist night. At the time this was a new playoff record for assists by a single player in one game. Edmonton went on to win game two, with Risto Siltanen's power play goal at 4:43 of the second period giving the Oilers a 2–1 lead, Edmonton eventually winning the game by a score of 3–1. Edmonton completed the sweep of the heavily favoured Canadiens in game three, defeating Montreal 6–2. Gretzky led all scorers in the three-game series, finishing with 11 points (3G, 8A).

(4) Los Angeles Kings vs. (13) New York Rangers 

The Los Angeles Kings entered the playoffs as the fourth overall seed in the league with 99 points, winning the tiebreaker with the Buffalo Sabres in wins (43 to 39). The New York Rangers earned 74 points during the regular season and finished thirteenth overall, winning the tiebreaker with the Edmonton Oilers in wins (30 to 29). This was the second playoff meeting between these two teams, with the only previous meeting being the 1979 Preliminary round, where New York defeated Los Angeles in two-game sweep. The Kings won three of the four games in this year's regular season series.

The Rangers won game one in large part due to the impressive goaltending performance of Steve Baker, as he turned away 31 of the Kings' 32 shots. Game two was marked by a brawl at the end of the first period; six players were ejected from the game as result of this. The Kings won game two 5–4 on the strength of a Dean Hopkins goal at 17:16 of the third period. Game three was dominated by the Rangers, as eight different players would score in the game for New York, and the Rangers won 10–3 on home ice. Game four was tied 3–3 in the third period, until Tom Laidlaw's goal at 6:44 gave the Rangers a 4–3 lead. The Rangers added two more goals in the third, earning a series-clinching 6–3 victory. Ranger forwards Ron Duguay and Ulf Nilsson each scored a goal in every game of this series.

(5) Buffalo Sabres vs. (12) Vancouver Canucks 

The Buffalo Sabres entered the playoffs as the Adams Division champions, earning 99 points, losing the tiebreaker with the Los Angeles Kings in wins (43 to 39). The Vancouver Canucks earned 76 points during the regular season and finished twelfth overall in the league. This was the second playoff meeting between these two teams, and was a rematch of last year's Preliminary Round, where Buffalo defeated Vancouver in four games. These teams split this year's four-game regular season series.

The Sabres swept Vancouver in three games, eliminating the Canucks in the preliminary round for the second consecutive season. Buffalo forced game one to overtime as Andre Savard scored the tying goal with just 8 seconds left in the third period. Rookie centre Alan Haworth scored the game-winning goal for Buffalo five minutes into overtime. The Sabres scored three times on the power play in game two, winning the game 5–2. Vancouver attempted to mount a comeback from a 4–1 deficit in the third period of game three before Buffalo's Tony McKegney scored his second goal of the game, giving the Sabres a 5–3 lead. Buffalo hung on to their 5–3 lead and clinched the series with a game three victory.

(6) Philadelphia Flyers vs. (11) Quebec Nordiques 

The Philadelphia Flyers entered the playoffs as the sixth seed in the league with 97 points. The Quebec Nordiques earned 78 points during the regular season and finished eleventh overall, losing the tiebreaker with the Chicago Black Hawks in wins (31 to 30). This was the first playoff meeting between these two teams. Quebec won this year's four-game regular season series earning five of eight points. This series also marked the first appearance of a team representing Quebec City in the Stanley Cup playoffs in 68 years. The most recent team to represent Quebec City prior to this was the Quebec Bulldogs who won the Stanley Cup in 1913, in the Bulldogs' final playoff appearance.

The home team won all games of this series. Bill Barber and Ken Linseman scored five points each in the first two games of the series. The Flyers won both games in Philadelphia, taking a 2–0 series lead. Game three was a battle of goaltenders, as the game remained scoreless until 9:48 of the third period, when Michel Goulet scored the eventual game-winning goal; Quebec won game three 2–0. Philadelphia took a 3–1 lead into the third period in game four, however the Nordiques made a comeback, tying the game in the third period. Quebec completed the comeback 37 seconds into overtime as Dale Hunter scored the game-winning goal. Ken Linseman's three points in the third period of Game 5 helped ensure a Philadelphia series-clinching win, 5–2.

(7) Calgary Flames vs. (10) Chicago Black Hawks 

The Calgary Flames entered the playoffs as the seventh seed in the league with 92 points. The Chicago Black Hawks earned 78 points during the regular season and finished tenth overall, winning the tiebreaker with the Quebec Nordiques in wins (31 to 30). This was the first playoff meeting between these two teams. Chicago won this year's four-game regular season series earning five of eight points. This series also marked the first appearance of a team representing Calgary in the Stanley Cup playoffs in 56 years. The most recent team to represent Calgary prior to this was the Calgary Tigers who lost the WCHL Final in 1925.

The Flames recorded their first sweep and first playoff series victory in franchise history. In game one, Calgary's Kent Nilsson recorded a point on every Calgary goal, helping the Flames to a 4–3 win. Calgary scored three times in the third period of game two and won the game decisively by a score of 6–2. The Black Hawks heavily out-shot the Flames in game three; Rejean Lemelin made 61 saves for the Flames. Chicago tied the game on a Darryl Sutter goal with 43 seconds left in the third period. However the Black Hawks came up short in double overtime as Willi Plett scored the series-clinching goal for the Flames at 15:17.

(8) Boston Bruins vs. (9) Minnesota North Stars 

The Boston Bruins entered the playoffs as the eighth seed in the league with 87 points, winning the tiebreaker with the Minnesota North Stars in wins (37 to 35). The North Stars earned 87 points during the regular season and finished ninth overall, losing the tiebreaker with the Bruins in wins (37 to 35). This was the first and to date only playoff meeting between these two teams. Boston won this year's four-game regular season series earning five of eight points.

The North Stars swept the Bruins in three games. Minnesota won game one in overtime due to Steve Payne's hat trick goal at 3:34. The North Stars' win in game one was the first-ever victory for the franchise in the Boston Garden (they went winless in their first 35 games in Boston over fourteen seasons). In game two, Boston's Brad Park and Minnesota's Dino Ciccarelli both scored four points in a high-scoring 9-6 Minnesota victory. The North Stars scored four times in the first period of game three and they did not relinquish the lead, eliminating the Bruins with a 6–3 win.

Quarterfinals

(1) New York Islanders vs. (8) Edmonton Oilers

This was the first playoff meeting between these two teams. The Islanders won the season series earning six of eight points in the year's four-game regular season series.

The Islanders eliminated the Oilers in six games; the Islanders also scored a power play goal in every game of this series. The Islanders' special teams dominated game one, as New York scored three times on the power play and added a shorthanded goal in an 8-2 Islanders win. Denis Potvin's hat trick and five point night in game two led the Islanders to a 6–3 victory. Wayne Gretzky scored his second hat trick of the playoffs in game three as the Oilers won the game by a score of 5–2. The Islanders won game four in overtime as Ken Morrow scored at 5:41 to give New York a 5–4 win. When Edmonton won game five 4–3, the Oilers' victory marked the only time in the 1981 Stanley Cup playoffs that the Islanders lost a game on home ice. Bob Nystrom's third goal of the playoffs in Game six became the eventual series-clinching goal for the Islanders as New York won the game 5–2.

(2) St. Louis Blues vs. (7) New York Rangers 

This was the first playoff series meeting between these two teams. St. Louis won the season series winning all four games of this year's regular season series.

The Rangers eliminated the Blues in six games. Bernie Federko's three point night in Game one led St. Louis to a 6–3 victory. The Rangers overcame a one-goal deficit in the third period of Game two by scoring three goals in a span of 2:46, winning the game by a score of 6–4 and evening the series at one game each. Anders Hedberg's go ahead goal in third period of Game two was just the second successful penalty shot in Stanley Cup playoff history. The Rangers dominated the second period of Game three scoring four goals on fifteen shots taking a three-goal lead into the third period. New York hung on to win the game 6–3. Steve Baker allowed just one goal on 34 shots in Game four leading the Rangers to a 4–1 victory and a commanding 3–1 series lead. With the Blues trailing 3–2 in the second period of Game five Jorgen Pettersson scored his third goal of the playoffs tying the game at 3, he scored a power play goal in the third period giving the Blues a 4–3 victory. The Blues trailed in Game six 4–0 before scoring three goals in 1:50, however they were never able to get on equal terms losing the game 7–4 and series 4–2.

(3) Buffalo Sabres vs. (6) Minnesota North Stars

This was the second playoff meeting between these two teams, with Buffalo sweeping the only previous meeting in two games in the 1977 Stanley Cup Preliminary Round. Minnesota won the season series earning five of eight points in this year's four-game regular season series.

The North Stars defeated the Sabres in five games. Game one required overtime as the teams exchanged the lead throughout regulation time. Minnesota winger Steve Payne ended the game just 22 seconds into the first overtime period; to date this is still the quickest playoff overtime goal in North Stars/Stars franchise history and tied for the tenth fastest in league history. Steve Christoff and Dino Ciccarelli each scored twice for the North Stars in game two as Minnesota took a 2–0 series lead with a 5–2 victory. Buffalo goaltender Don Edwards made 43 saves in a losing effort in game three as the Sabres lost by a score of 6–4. Minnesota forced overtime in game four after trailing by three goals in the second period; the Sabres extended the series with an overtime win as Craig Ramsay scored at 16:32 of the first overtime period. Don Beaupre made 36 saves for Minnesota in game five as they advanced to the Stanley Cup Semifinals for the second consecutive season.

(4) Philadelphia Flyers vs. (5) Calgary Flames

This was the second and most recent playoff meeting between these two teams, with Philadelphia sweeping the Atlanta Flames in their only previous meeting in four-game sweep in the 1974 Stanley Cup Quarterfinals. The teams split this year's four-game regular season series.

The Flames defeated the Flyers in seven games. Philadelphia goaltender Rick St. Croix made 35 saves as the Flyers took game one 4–0. After exchanging goals in the first period of game two, the Flames scored three times in the second period and held on late to even the series with a 5–4 victory. Willi Plett gave Calgary the lead early in the third period of game three and Pat Riggin made 47 saves in the Flames 2–1 win. Calgary needed two goals in third period of game four from Randy Holt to secure their third straight one goal victory in the series. Philadelphia forced a sixth game in the series with a commanding 9–4 win in game five; Brian Propp recorded a natural hat trick in the first period for the Flyers. Forward Ken Linseman's second goal in game six for Philadelphia held up as the game-winner as the Flyers avoided elimination with a 3–2 triumph. The Flames struck three times on the power-play in game seven as they ended the series with a 4–1 victory. With the win Calgary became the first relocated team in league history to advance to the third round of the playoffs in their inaugural season in their new location (this feat was later surpassed by the Colorado Avalanche in 1996).

Semifinals

(1) New York Islanders vs. (4) New York Rangers

This was the third playoff meeting between these two rivals. Both teams have split their previous two meetings. They last met in the 1979 Stanley Cup Semifinals where the Rangers won in six games. The teams split this year's four-game regular season series.

(2) Calgary Flames vs. (3) Minnesota North Stars

This was the first playoff meeting between these two teams. The teams split this year's four-game regular season series.

Stanley Cup Finals 

This was the first playoff meeting between these two teams. The Islanders made their second consecutive and second overall appearance in the Finals; they defeated the Philadelphia Flyers the previous year in six games. Minnesota made their first Finals appearance in their fourteenth season after entering the league in 1967. The Islanders won this year's four-game regular season series earning six of eight points.

See also 
1980–81 NHL season
List of NHL seasons
List of Stanley Cup champions

References 

 

playoffs
Stanley Cup playoffs